DCSD may refer to:
Danish Committees on Scientific Dishonesty
Davenport Community School District
DeKalb County School District
Duchesne County School District